Moses “Moritz” or “Moschkatz” Häusler (July 20, 1901 in Solotvyn – December 24, 1952 in Vienna) was an early twentieth century Austrian football inside forward who played professionally in Austria and the United States.  He also earned seven caps with the Austria national football team between 1923 and 1925.

Player

Professional
Häusler began his career with Vienna based youth teams Armania and Romania.  In 1918, he signed with Hakoah Vienna in Austria, but did not break into the first team until the 1919–1920 season.  However, he remained a minor role player until the 1922–1923 season.  In 1926, Hakoah Vienna toured the United States.  Impressed by the high pay and low level of anti-Semitism compared to Europe, Häusler and several of his team mates decided to return to the United States to play in the American Soccer League.  In the fall of 1926, Häusler signed with the New York Giants.  In 1928, the ASL and the United States Soccer Federation began a struggle for supremacy in U.S. soccer.  Known as the “Soccer War”, it led to the USFA declaring the ASL an “outlaw league” in the fall of 1928.  At that time, Häusler had already played six games with the Giants.  Declining to play with an “outlaw team” Häusler jumped to the competing, and legal, Eastern Professional Soccer League where he signed with New York Hakoah.  New York Hakoah took second place in the ESL and won the 1929 National Challenge Cup with Häusler scoring a goal in Hakoah’s 3-0 victory over St. Louis Madison Kennel.  At the end of 1929, the ASL made peace with USFA which brought about the merger of the ASL and ESL and the merger of the ESL New York Hakoah with the ASL Brooklyn Hakoah to form the Hakoah All-Stars.  Häusler joined the new team and remained with it until 1931.  That year, he signed with the New York Americans as the ASL began to collapse.  In 1933, the Americans lost in the 1933 National Challenge Cup championship series.  Following that loss, Häusler returned to Austria, where he rejoined Hakoah Vienna for the 1933–1934 season.   He retired and became a coach, but returned to Hakoah Vienna at the end of the 1935–1936 season.

National team
Häusler earned seven caps, scoring two goals, with the Austria national team.  His first came in an August 1923 victory over Finland.  He scored in his second game with the national team, a win over Romania.  His last game was a November 1925 game with Switzerland.

Coach
Following his retirement in 1934, Häusler moved to Poland to coach Garbarnia Kraków.  He later coached in northern Europe and Luxembourg.

In 1950, he returned to Vienna, where he owned a coffee house until his death in 1952.

External links
 1924/25 Hakoah team photo

References

1901 births
1952 deaths
People from Ivano-Frankivsk Oblast
People from the Kingdom of Galicia and Lodomeria
Jews from Galicia (Eastern Europe)
Austro-Hungarian Jews
Ukrainian Jews
Austrian footballers
Austrian expatriate footballers
Austria international footballers
Jewish footballers
Jewish Austrian sportspeople
SC Hakoah Wien footballers
American Soccer League (1921–1933) players
New York Giants (soccer) players
Hakoah All-Stars players
Eastern Professional Soccer League (1928–29) players
New York Hakoah players
New York Americans (soccer) (1930–1933) players
Expatriate soccer players in the United States
Austrian expatriate sportspeople in the United States
Expatriate football managers in Luxembourg
Austrian expatriate sportspeople in Luxembourg
Association football inside forwards